Bête Noire is the seventh solo studio album by English singer Bryan Ferry, released on 2 November 1987 by Virgin Records in the United Kingdom and by Reprise Records in the United States. It was a commercial and critical success, peaking at No. 9 in the UK and was certified Gold by the British Phonographic Industry (BPI).

The first single, "The Right Stuff"—a collaboration with Johnny Marr adapted from the Smiths' instrumental B-side "Money Changes Everything"—was the album's only top-40 entry in the UK, peaking at No. 37. The second single, "Kiss and Tell", narrowly missed the UK top 40 (peaking at No. 41), but made the U.S. top 40 (becoming Ferry's only solo single to chart in the U.S. Top 40). The song also appeared in the drama film, Bright Lights, Big City (1988), starring Michael J. Fox. The third and final single, "Limbo", peaked at No. 86 in the UK. The promotional video for the single "Kiss and Tell" features the models Denice D. Lewis (who is also featured on the single's cover photograph), Christine Keeler and Mandy Smith.

Background
After the success of his previous studio album, Boys and Girls (1985), Ferry decided that it was time for a change of style in his career. In an attempt to give his music a more danceable sound, he joined forces with Patrick Leonard who was notable for having worked with Madonna. Leonard went on to co-write five of the album's songs. Guesting on the album would be Pink Floyd's former guitarist, David Gilmour, session musicians Guy Pratt, Marcus Miller, David Williams, Abraham Laboriel as well as Roxy Music's former touring guitarist Neil Hubbard and drummer Andy Newmark.

Fans, and critics have often speculated that the song "Kiss and Tell", was Ferry's response to Jerry Hall's tell-all book about their relationship published a couple of years earlier.

Lawsuits with E.G. Records
Prior to the release of the album, Ferry claimed that his recording agreement with the label E.G. ended in March 1987 and that he was in a position to sell his new album to any company. E.G. said that he was in breach of a 15-year contract which gave them exclusive rights to market the album in Canada and the United States. The action was heard at the High Court of Justice in London, and in a preliminary hearing, the parties agreed that if the album were to be released before the main hearing, Ferry was to pay a third of the royalties into a joint account with E.G. – which they would receive if they were to win the case. E.G. later won the case and they marketed the album in Canada and the United States.

The album was released in the United States by Reprise Records. Reprise Records 25598 debuted on the Billboard chart November 21, 1987, and spent 31 weeks on the chart peaking at No. 63.

1988–89 tour
Ferry toured Australia, Japan, United States, Canada, and Europe to promote the album. The Edge from U2 joined Ferry on stage at the Dublin show to perform the Irish folk song, "Carrickfergus" (which Ferry had previously recorded in 1978 for The Bride Stripped Bare) and Johnny Marr joined the backing band for "The Right Stuff" at the Manchester show. Roxy Music saxophonist and oboist Andy MacKay also joined the backing band for a few numbers at the London Palladium and Wembley Arena dates.

Several of the songs from the Glasgow show were included on several Bryan Ferry CD singles between 1993 and 1995.

Line-up

 Bryan Ferry – lead vocals
 Clifford Carter – keyboards 
 Neil Hubbard – guitars
 Jeff Thall – guitars
 Chester Kamen – guitars (1989 Dates Only)
 Luico Hopper – bass
 Andy Newmark – drums
 Steve Scales – percussion
 Andy Mackay – saxophones (Guest at the London dates)
 Michelle Cobbs – backing vocals
 Ednah Holt – backing vocals
 Yanick Étienne – backing vocals

Video release

The Bête Noire Tour movie was released 10 November 2008 by the EMI Productions studio. The DVD features a pair of solo performances by Bryan Ferry, the first performance previously released as New Town, was filmed during his 1988–89 Bête Noire European Tour. The bonus show is the previously unavailable Virgin Germany 25th Birthday concert in Munich in 2002.

Critical reception

Reviewing retrospectively for AllMusic, critic Ned Raggett wrote of the album, "Bête Noire sparkles as the highlight of Ferry's post-Roxy solo career, adding enough energy to make it more than Boys and Girls part two. Here, his trademark well-polished heartache strikes a fine balance between mysterious moodiness and dancefloor energy, and Leonard adds more than a few tricks that keep the pep up." The critic Robert Christgau wrote of the album, "As with Mick Jagger, of all people, the signal that self-imitation has sunk into self-parody is enunciatory ennui—vocal mannerisms that were once ur-posh are now just complacent." Billboard wrote of the album, "Former Roxy Music maestro's much-awaited follow-up to "Boys And Girls" harbingers well for his new association with Reprise. Like past Ferry solo efforts, this displays the singer/writer's usual suaveness; tunes hinge on his familiar theme of l'amour moderne on the rocks. Tracks are uniformly solid, although "Kiss & Tell" and "Seven Deadly Sins" stand out."

Anthony DeCurtis reviewed the album for Rolling Stone and wrote "Bête Noire is another step in Ferry's retreat from distinct songs into atmosphere and feel. The strategy can sometimes work wonderfully, as Ferry proved on the transcendent album Avalon from Roxy Music. But as his voice sinks more deeply into the murky layers of his music, as his lyrics are reduced to a Morse code of refined despair and his subjects recede into the mist, Ferry seems increasingly like Narcissus, enraptured by his own reflection in the pond - and the bottomless depth below." Mark Coleman reviewing for the Rolling Stone Album Guide stated "Bête Noire could use one solid melody. As hushed and haunted as ever, Ferry's deeply evocative voice nevertheless gets lost amid the grandiose and antiseptic musical trappings of the digital recording era. Bête Noire is depressingly tasteful and restrained—state-of-the-art rock wallpaper." Ira Robbins of the Trouser Press commented "The similarly restrained Bête Noire confirms Ferry's commitment to innocuous sophistication. That wonderful voice is his sole asset: what he's singing is all but irrelevant. But this record's stronger melodic development and a wider variety of danceable tempos than on Boys and Girls are palpable signs of life; the involvement of ex-Smiths guitarist Johnny Marr as a player and the co-writer of one near-exciting song ("The Right Stuff") is another positive touch. In the end, given one's diminished expectations,"Limbo," "Kiss and Tell" and "Day for Night" are coolly inviting and likable enough.

Track listing

Personnel
Note: The LP's sleeve notes includes "Vive la Résistance" to a list of musicians. Only their names are mentioned; their instruments and the exact songs on which they play are not. The following list merely tentatively mentions the instruments the same musicians have played on other Ferry records.

Musicians

 Bryan Ferry – lead vocals, keyboards, acoustic piano
 Patrick Leonard – keyboards, synthesizers 
 David Gilmour – guitars
 Neil Hubbard – guitars
 Dann Huff – guitars
 Chester Kamen – guitars
 Johnny Marr – guitars
 Bill Ruppert – guitars
 David Williams – guitars
 Abraham Laboriel – bass
 Marcus Miller – bass
 Guy Pratt – bass
 Vinnie Colaiuta – drums 
 Andy Newmark – drums
 John Robinson – drums
 Rhett Davies – drum machines
 Paulinho da Costa – percussion
 Jimmy Maelen – percussion
 Courtney Pine – saxophones
 Dan Wilensky – saxophones
 Mario Abramovich – violin
 José Libertella – bandoneon
 Luis Stazo – bandoneon
 Tawatha Agee – backing vocals
 Michelle Cobbs – backing vocals
 Yanick Étienne – backing vocals 
 Siedah Garrett – backing vocals
 Paul Johnson – backing vocals 
 Albert Sanchez – backing vocals 
 Fonzi Thornton – backing vocals

Technical
 All songs produced by Bryan Ferry and Patrick Leonard; Except "Kiss and Tell", "New Town", "The Right Stuff" and "Seven Deadly Sins" produced by Bryan Ferry, Patrick Leonard and Chester Kamen.
 Executive Producer – Simon Puxley 
 Recording Engineers – Ian Eales, Steve Jackson and Kevin Killen.
 Mixed by Bruce Lampcov and Alan Meyerson
 Mastered by Bob Ludwig at Masterdisk (New York, NY).
 Photography – Alistair Thain
 Tracks 1, 4, 5, 8 and 9 published by Virgin Music (Publishers) Ltd. and Johnny Yuma Music.
 Tracks 2 and 3 published by Virgin Music (Publishers) Ltd.
 Track 6 published by Virgin Music (Publishers) Ltd. and Warner Brothers Music Ltd.
 Track 7 published by Virgin Music (Publishers) Ltd., Warner Brothers Music Ltd. and Copyright Control.

Charts

Certifications

References

External links
 

1987 albums
Bryan Ferry albums
Albums produced by Patrick Leonard
Virgin Records albums
E.G. Records albums